John C. Thomas is an American screenwriter based in California. With his brother Jim Thomas, he wrote and/or was substantially involved with the screenplays of numerous films - including Predator (1987),  Predator 2 (1990),  Executive Decision (1996), Wild Wild West (1999), and Behind Enemy Lines (2001), which spawned a franchise.

Early life
Born in Needles, California and raised in Bakersfield, John  worked as lifeguard, teacher, ditch digger and carpenter, as well as attempting to be a writer. His brother had the idea for the script that would become Predator, in 1983, and asked John for help. Thomas and his brother took inspiration from a joke circulating Hollywood concerning the Rocky franchise and wrote a screenplay based on it. The Thomas script for Predator was originally titled Hunter. The script was picked up by 20th Century Fox in 1985, and turned over to producer Joel Silver who, based on his experience with Commando, decided to turn the science fiction pulp storyline into a big-budget film.

Thomas worked on a number of Hollywood productions through the 1980s, 1990s and 2000s, such as The Rescue (1988), Two-Fisted Tales (1992) and Mission to Mars (2000). Along with his brother, he created the short-lived TV series Hard Time on Planet Earth. Scheduled opposite NBC's Unsolved Mysteries and ABC's Growing Pains on Wednesdays, Hard Time on Planet Earth ranked 65th out of 81 programs upon its premiere. Ratings for the series never improved and the series was canceled by CBS in May 1989.

References

External links

Year of birth missing (living people)
20th-century American screenwriters
21st-century American screenwriters
American male screenwriters
Living people
People from Needles, California
Screenwriters from California
20th-century American male writers
21st-century American male writers